Weightless may refer to:

Weightlessness, the condition that exists for an object or person when they experience little or no acceleration
Weightless (wireless communications), proposed proprietary open wireless technology standard
Song to Song, a 2017 American film by Terrence Malick, originally titled Weightless
Weightless (novel), a 2015 novel by Sarah Bannan

Music

Albums
 Weightless (Animals as Leaders album), and a song from that album, 2011
 Weightless (Katie Herzig album), 2006
 Weightless (The Skinny Boys album), 1986
 Weightless EP, by Secondhand Serenade, 2011

Songs
 "Weightless" (All Time Low song), 2009
 "Weightless" (Wet Wet Wet song), 2008
 "Weightless", by Black Lab from their album Passion Leaves a Trace, 2007
 "Weightless", by God Is an Astronaut from their album Origins, 2013
 "Weightless", by Hayden James from the album Between Us, 2019
 "Weightless", by Infernal, 2017
 "Weightless", by Marconi Union, 2011
 "Weightless", by Northlane from the album Node, 2015
 "Weightless", by Spacey Jane from the album Sunlight, 2020
 "Weightless", by Within the Ruins from the album Elite, 2013